Karim Haseleh-ye Sofla (also Romanized as Karīm Ḩaşeleh-ye Soflá) is a village in Hasanabad Rural District, in the Central District of Eslamabad-e Gharb County, Kermanshah Province, Iran. At the 2006 census, its population was 103, in 20 families.

References 

Populated places in Eslamabad-e Gharb County